The 1953 Paphos earthquake struck British Cyprus (present day Cyprus) on the morning of September 10, at 06:05 EET. It had a magnitude of  6.5 on the surface-wave magnitude scale, and had a maximum intensity of X (Extreme) on the Modified Mercalli intensity scale. The epicenter of this earthquake was situated off the island's west coast, near the city of Paphos where 40 people had died, and a least 100 injured. It was reportedly felt in Rhodes, Turkey, Egypt, Lebanon and Kastelorizo.

Geological setting 
Cyprus is wedged in a complex zone of interaction between the Anatolian (which part of the larger Eurasian Plate) and African Plate. These two plates are colliding along the Cyprus Arc, a plate boundary that runs south of the island. This subduction zone is offset by a small transform fault known as the Paphos Transform Fault. The plate boundary, coupled with the Dead Sea Transform and East Anatolian Fault accommodates motion of the African and Arabian Plates. This has resulted in moderately destructive, mid-range earthquakes, including a magnitude 7.1–7.5 in 1222 which caused great devastation to the island and generated a tsunami.

Earthquake 
The earthquake on September 10 was associated with strike-slip faulting along or near the Paphos Transform Fault. It would be one of the most intense tremor ever felt in the region. Forty people were killed and 100 injured, mainly due to collapses as bodies were being pulled from the rubble. Another 4,000 were made homeless in the 158 towns and villages that were affected. The earthquake also triggered landslides which further damaged communities. Shaking was accompanied by a small tsunami which waves were seen along the coast of Paphos without damage. Total damage from the quake has been estimated at £2 million (1953 rate).

Response 
Rehabilitation and assistance were provided by the Government of the United Kingdom. On September 13, tents and aid supplies were air flown by the Royal Air Force while the Royal Navy sailed through the Suez Canal to help contribute to the recovery efforts. Blankets and clothings were supplied to those affected by the British Red Cross.

See also 
List of earthquakes in 1953
List of earthquakes in Cyprus

References 

1953 earthquakes
1953 in Cyprus
September 1953 events in Europe
Earthquakes in Cyprus
Paphos
Paphos District
1953 disasters in Cyprus
September 1953 events in Asia
Tsunamis in Cyprus